Link'u Link'u (Aymara for zig-zag, also spelled Linkho Linkho, Linko Linko) is a  mountain in the Cordillera Real in the Andes of Bolivia. It is situated in the La Paz Department at the border of the Murillo Province, Palca Municipality, and the Sud Yungas Province, Irupana Municipality. Link'u Link'u lies south-east of the mountain Illimani.

References 

Mountains of La Paz Department (Bolivia)